Efraín Morales Sánchez (born 27 June 1953) is a Mexican politician affiliated with the Party of the Democratic Revolution. As of 2014 he served as Deputy of the LX Legislature of the Mexican Congress representing the Federal Dissitrict.

References

1953 births
Living people
Politicians from Mexico City
Members of the Chamber of Deputies (Mexico)
Institutional Revolutionary Party politicians
21st-century Mexican politicians
Deputies of the LX Legislature of Mexico